Minoru Miki (16 March 19308 December 2011) was a Japanese composer and artistic director, particularly known for his promotional activities in favor of Japanese (as well as Chinese and Korean) traditional instruments and some of their performers.

Biography
His catalog, where the aforementioned traditional instruments figure profusely either solo or in various types of ensembles with or without Western instruments, demonstrates large stylistic and formal diversity. It includes operas and various kinds of stage music and orchestral, concerto, chamber and solo music, and music for films. Miki was probably  the second best-known Japanese composer overseas after Tōru Takemitsu.

He was a pioneer in the composition of contemporary classical music for large ensembles of traditional Japanese musical instruments. In 1964, he founded the Nihon Ongaku Shūdan (Pro Musica Nipponia ensemble), also known as Ensemble Nipponia, for which he has composed extensively.

Miki was born in Tokushima on March 16, 1930. His first musical experiences were of the traditional music of his region. He had no formal music education before he moved to Okayama for high school, where he first had contact with European classical music. From there, he moved to Tokyo, graduating from Tokyo University of the Arts in 1964. In that same year, Miki founded Pro musica Nipponia (日本音楽集団), an orchestra of traditional Japanese instruments for which he would compose a large number of works. He also began collaborating with koto virtuoso Keiko Nosaka, developing the 20-string koto and reviving the instrument's repertoire with many new works in various genres and combinations, including five concertos for koto and orchestra. Miki composed his first opera, Shunkinsho in 1975, based on Tanizaki's eponymous novel. Interest in Japanese traditional music by members of the English Music Theatre Company resulted in the commission of the opera Ada, An Actor's Revenge, to an English libretto by James Kirkup. Ada premiered in London in 1979 and was one of the last works commissioned and performed by the EMTC before its ultimate disbandment in 1980. During this period, Miki developed a relationship with director Colin Graham that was to last until the latter's death in 2007. The most notable result of this collaboration was the opera Jōruri which was commissioned by Graham for the Opera Theatre of Saint Louis and premiered in 1985. It was here where he had moved to following the disbandment of the EMTC.

From 1992 with Wakahime, Miki adopted a pan-Asian perspective, incorporating music and instruments from a number of Asian countries into his compositions and collaborating with a number of Asian artists. Some of Miki's operas from thereon – mostly notably Wakahime and Aien – also increasingly dealt with episodes of Japan's presence and interaction with its neighboring Asian countries. This recurring theme was often performed on stage and within the plot of those various Asian countries' traditional instruments.

Miki died of sepsis at Mitaka city hospital, in Tokyo, during the early hours of December 8 2011.

Works

Operatic cycle on Japanese history 
 Shunkinshō (1975)
 Ada, An Actor's Revenge (1979); piano score by Geoffrey Tozer
 Jōruri (1985)
 Wakahime (1991)
 Shizuka to Yoshitsune (1993)
 The River Sumida / Kusabira (1995)
 Genji monogatari (The Tale of Genji) (1999)
 Ai-en (2005)
 The Happy Pagoda (2010)

Other operas
 The Monkey Poet (1983)
 Yomigaeru (1986–1992)
 Terute and Oguri (1993)

Ballet
 From the Land of Light

Orchestral
Trinita sinfonica (1953)
Symphony Joya (1960)
Symphony from Life (1980)
Beijing Requiem for string orchestra (1990)
MAI 舞 (1992)

Concertante
Marimba Concerto (1969)
Eurasian Trilogy  (1969; 74; 81), Japanese and Western instruments
Koto Concerto No. 1 (1974); this piece is also the second movement of Eurasian Trilogy
Koto Concerto No. 2 (1978)
Koto Concerto No. 3 (1980); aka Concerto Requiem
Koto Concerto No. 4 (1984); aka Pine Concerto 
Koto Concerto No. 5 (1985)
Z Concerto (1992), marimba and percussion soli
Pipa Concerto (1997)
Requiem 99 (1998); marimba solo, orchestra of Japanese traditional instruments
Trio Concerto (2000), shakuhachi, pipa, 21-koto soli, orchestra of Japanese instruments
Shakuhachi Concerto (2002), aka Lotus Concerto

Chamber music
Piano Sextet (1965), fl, ob, cl, bn, hn, pf
Piano Trio (1986), pf, vn, vc
String Quartet (1989)
Marimba Spiritual (1983), marimba solo with percussion trio

Solo
Time for Marimba, (1968), marimba
Ballades for koto (I-Winter, 1969; II-Spring, 1976; III-Summer, 1983, ; IV-Autumn, 1990)

Film music
 On the Road: A Document ( Dokyumento rojō) (1964); directed by Noriaki Tsuchimoto
In the Realm of the Senses  (1976); directed by Nagisa Oshima

Vocal
 Shirabe, 4 songs for tenor and harp (1979)
 Requiem (1963), baritone solo, male chorus, orchestra
 The Mole's Tale (1966), male chorus, 2 perc.

Written

References

三木稔、「日本楽器法」、東京：音楽之友社、1996年。
三木稔、「オペラ《源氏物語》ができるまで」、東京：中央アート出版社、2001年。

External links
 

1930 births
2011 deaths
20th-century classical composers
20th-century Japanese composers
21st-century classical composers
21st-century Japanese composers
Japanese classical composers
Japanese male classical composers
Japanese opera composers
Male opera composers
People from Tokushima Prefecture
Tokyo University of the Arts alumni
20th-century Japanese male musicians
21st-century Japanese male musicians